Cuke may refer to:

"Cuke", a nickname for Cucumber

People with the name Cuke include:

Michelle Bush-Cuke (born 1961), Caymanian long-distance runner
Cuke Barrows (1883–1955), American baseball outfielder

See also
 Çükəş, a village in the municipality of Sipiyəpart in the Astara Rayon of Azerbaijan
 Cucumber (disambiguation)
 Sea cucumber, a type of echinoderm marine animal
 Zuke (disambiguation)